Traditional dancing in the Netherlands is often called "Folkloristisch", sometimes "Boerendansen" ("farmer-dancing") or "Klompendansen" (clog dancing). Wooden shoes are worn as an essential part of the traditional costume for Dutch clogging, or Klompendanskunst. Clogs for dancing are made lighter than the traditional 700-year-old design. The soles are made from ash wood, and the top part is cut lower by the ankle. Dancers create a rhythm by tapping the toes and heels on a wooden floor.

In 2006, nearly 500 teenagers attempted the "Guinness Book of World Records" bid for the largest number of clog dancers. It took place in The Hague. They were dancing the ballet version of the Dutch clog dance rather than the folk version. The ballet La fille mal gardée contains a well-known clog dance. For this specific dance the choreography was created by Stanley Holden (1928–2007), though Frederick Ashton took overall responsibility for it.

See also
 Dutch folk dance

References

External links
 Folk dancing in the Netherlands, dance descriptions, video's, costumes and groups

Dutch dances